{{Infobox person
| name          = Zezé Macedo 
| image         =
| caption       = Macedo in 1959
| birth_name    = Maria José de Macedo
| birth_date    = 6 May 1916
| birth_place   = Silva Jardim, Rio de Janeiro, Brazil
| death_date    = 8 October 1999 (Aged 83)
| death_place   = Rio de Janeiro, Brazil 
| resting_place = 
| resting_place_coordinates = 
| other_names   = 
| occupation    = Television and film actress
| known_for     = Comedy roles
| notable_works = 
| years_active  = 
| spouse        = 1. Alcides Manhães, 2. Vasco Lino Magalhães, 3. Victor Zambito
| partner       = 
| children      = 
| parents       = 
| website       = 
| awards        = 
}}Zezé Macedo' (6 May 1916 – 8 October 1999) was a Brazilian comedienne and actress in radio, cinema and television, being the female record holder in Brazil for film appearances, having made over 100 films. She also published four books of poetry.

Early life
Maria José de Macedo was born in Silva Jardim in the Brazilian state of Rio de Janeiro on 6 May 1916. Her stepfather, Columbano Santos, was a notary and the local mayor as well as being a great supporter of the theatre. Her theatrical debut was at the age of four. As she could not read, she memorized the lines by listening to them read by her stepfather. At the age of fifteen, she married a mechanic and electrician, Alcides Manhães, giving up being an actress and moving to Niterói. They had a son who died at just one year of age when he fell from his paternal grandmother's lap and fractured his skull. Upon learning of her son's death, she gave a huge cry and was then silent for a long time, suffering shock. When she spoke again her voice had changed: it was completely hoarse and would remain that way for the rest of her life. The couple broke up shortly after their son's death and Macedo started working as a clerk at her stepfather's office.
Radio and television
Through her stepfather's connections, she began to read her poems on the Grande Jornal Fluminense, a show broadcast on Sundays by Rádio Tamoio. In 1944, she wrote and read stories of Brazil's participation in World War II. She became the secretary of the scriptwriter Dias Gomes and the actor Rodolfo Mayer for three years and, at the same time, gradually began to appear on radio shows, in plays and reading poems. In 1954, she published her first book of poetry, Coração Profano (Profane Heart), which was a great success. She would go on to publish three more books of poetry. Replacing another actress in a recording when the actress did not turn up, she came to the attention of the screenwriter and actor, Paulo Porto, who gave her the opportunity to start appearing on television. Her first performance was in the comedy programme Mesa Quadrada (1953), a satire of the football programmes on television. Macedo was thin and short with big eyes and a mocking expression, and this led to her nearly always being subsequently chosen for comedy roles, frequently as a maid, despite her wish to play more dramatic roles in television soap operas.

Cinema
Through her poetry and appearances on radio and television she came to the attention of the screen writer and director, Watson Macedo, and appeared in the films Warning to the Sailors (1950) and The Oil is Ours (O Petróleo É Nosso– 1954). From then on, Zezé Macedo became a strong presence in the cinema, acting for several production companies and still mainly playing humorous roles. Among the films she participated in were De Vento em Popa (1957), directed by Carlos Manga, in which she plays an opera singer, escaping from the role of a maid for a change; O Homem do Sputnik (1959), considered by moviegoers as one of the best chanchadas, a type of film that satirised Hollywood movies, and Esse Milhão É Meu (1959). In these three films, she played alongside the comedy actor Oscarito, who insisted that she perform with him. She also worked with the actor Grande Otelo. However, although she performed in many chanchadas, she never had a starring role.

With the decline of the chanchada in the early 1960s, Macedo began to dedicate herself more to theatre and television, while continuing to make films. From 1965, she was hired by TV Globo, for which she would act until the end of her life. In the 1970s, her film career was boosted with the emergence of pornochanchadas, which were a type of sex comedy that stopped short of being pornographic. Meanwhile, on television, she began a partnership with Chico Anysio, which resulted in her two most famous characters: Biscoito, the ugly but rich wife of a drunk; and Dona Bela, a student. 
Later years
Towards the end of her life Macedo began to reduce her workload, devoting herself more and more to television. In 1983, she starred as the protagonist in a satire for children on Steven Spielberg's E.T. the Extra-Terrestrial. Three years later, she won a special award from the jury at the Festival de Gramado for her performance in Ivan Cardoso's As Sete Vampiras (The Seven Vampires). Her last feature film was Ivan Cardoso's The Scarlet Scorpion in 1990.  
Private life
Macedo was married to the actor, Vasco Lino Magalhães, for a decade from 1950. In 1961, she married the actor and singer Victor Zambito, ten years her junior. The two remained together for 38 years, until Macedo's death.
Death
On 26 August 1999, Macedo suffered a stroke and was admitted to a clinic in Rio de Janeiro. She died on 9 October 1999. In 2012 her life was portrayed in the play A Revenge of the Mirror: the Story of Zezé Macedo, written by Flávio Marinho and starring Betty Gofman.

Selected filmographyAviso aos navegantes (1950)O Petróleo é Nosso (1954)Carnaval em Marte (1955) - JustinaTrabalhou Bem, Genival'' (1955)
Sítio do Picapau Amarelo (1977) - Dona Carochinha

References

1916 births
1999 deaths
Brazilian television actresses
People from Rio de Janeiro (state)
Brazilian film actresses